Tropidophorus microlepis, the small-scaled water skink,  is a species of skink found in Laos, Vietnam, Cambodia, and Thailand.

References

microlepis
Reptiles of Laos
Reptiles of Vietnam
Reptiles of Cambodia
Reptiles of Thailand
Reptiles described in 1861
Taxa named by Albert Günther